Sunset Serenade is a 1942 American Western film directed by Joseph Kane and starring Roy Rogers, and George "Gabby" Hayes.

Plot
Vera Martin, a scheming housekeeper in her late twenties, receives orders to vacate the Bagley Ranch, over which she has held sway since the death of the owner. Bagley has left the ranch to his nephew Rodney T. Blackton, instead of to Vera as she had expected. Adjoining ranch owner Gregg Jackson arrives to offer his sympathy... and a possible way out. He plans to dam the river above the Bagley Ranch, diverting the water to his property leaving all the other ranchers dry and, while he is at it, to rustle all the Bagley cattle and fake a $5,000 mortgage on the ranch, licking new-owner Ridney T. before he starts. Roy Rogers, Gabby Whittaker and the Sons of the Pioneers, pass through the country just as Sylvia Clark, guardian of the one-year old Rodney T., arrives with her ward. They all arrive at the ranch just as Vera and Jackson are completing their frame-up. Roy is suspicious, and when Jackson informs Sylvia that the ranch is barren, has no cattle and a mortgage due in two weeks, Roy and his friends decide to stay and help. They find the stolen cattle and Roy sells them to government buyer Clifford Sheldon for enough money to clear the fake mortgage. Sheldon, discovering he has bought the same cattle from Jackson previously, starts an investigation.

Cast 
Roy Rogers as Roy Rogers
George "Gabby" Hayes as Gabby
Bob Nolan as Bob
Sons of the Pioneers as Ranch hands / Musicians
Helen Parrish as Sylvia Clark
Onslow Stevens as Gregg Jackson
Joan Woodbury as Vera Martin
Frank M. Thomas as Clifford Sheldon
Roy Barcroft as Henchman Bart Reynolds
Jack Kirk as Sheriff Praskins

Soundtrack 
 "Song of the San Joaquin" (Written by Tim Spencer)
 "I'm A Cowboy Rockefeller" (Written by Tim Spencer)
 "Mavourneen O'Shea" (Written by Tim Spencer)
 "He's A No-Good Son-of-a-Gun" (Written by Bob Nolan)
 "(Headin' For The)Home Corral" (Written by Bob Nolan)
 "Sandman Lullaby" (Written by Bob Nolan)

External links 

1942 films
1942 Western (genre) films
American black-and-white films
Republic Pictures films
American Western (genre) films
Films directed by Joseph Kane
1940s English-language films
1940s American films